The Cinema for Peace Foundation is a registered, non-profit organization based in Berlin, Germany. It supports film-based projects dealing with global humanitarian and environmental issues, and coordinates the Cinema for Peace awards.

History
The Cinema for Peace Foundation was founded in 2008 building on the successful outcome of the annual Cinema for Peace Gala, which started in 2002. Since then, the Cinema for Peace Foundation has been running internally originated, cinema-based humanitarian projects.

In 2018, Cinema for Peace Foundation expanded its cinema-based humanitarian projects to include arranging medical treatment for Pussy Riot activist Pyotr Verzilof, after he was poisoned. Pussy Riot and Cinema for Peace had earlier coordinated humanitarian projects in 2014.

On 22 August 2020, Cinema for Peace organized an emergency medical transport of Russian opposition candidate and anti-corruption activist Alexei Navalny to a Berlin hospital, after his suspected poisoning was recorded in a photograph and on video. Cinema for Peace Foundation's Jaka Bizilj was interviewed at the hospital as Navalny remained in a coma. On 2 September, the German government announced Navalny had been poisoned by nerve agent Novichok.

Cinema for Peace Foundation Projects
The Cinema for Peace Foundation German School Film Catalogue. The Cinema for Peace Foundation School Film Catalogue covers issues such as war, human rights and discrimination.  The Foundation works with teachers and students in German public schools to use the catalogue as a catalyst for further inquiry into the issues covered by the films.

Genocide Film Library Bosnia-Herzegovina The Cinema for Peace Foundation began operating in Bosnia-Herzegovina in December 2011, when it established an office tasked with the creation of the Genocide Film Library. Following the example of the University of Southern California’s Shoah Foundation Institute, the Genocide Film Library will bring together audiovisual testimonies of 10,000 survivors of the Srebrenica genocide.

Safe Keeping Darfur/Sudan. In 2010, the Cinema for Peace Foundation distributed 200 motion sensitive, mini-video cameras, laptop computers and satellite uplinks, to humanitarian workers in refugee camps in Darfur to discourage people from committing crimes against refugees, as well as to collect evidence against the perpetrators to be used in criminal trials. In 2013, Cinema for Peace Foundation supported filmmaker Andrew Berends documenting the atrocities in the Nuba Mountains.

Green Film Online Platform.  The Cinema for Peace Foundation hosts a platform on its website to enable access to environmentally conscience films, supported by the foundation and also allow visitors to screen some short films about the environment for free.

Film Against AIDS.  In 2010, the Cinema for Peace Foundation organized a screening of the film, Themba - A Boy Called Hope for school children in Cape Town, South Africa, introduced by the Nobel Peace LaureateArchbishop Desmond Tutu.  The screenings of the film were later extended to nine further rural South African provinces to raise awareness about AIDS prevention.  In December 2010, the Foundation expanded the program to 60 German public schools. The screening campaign was continued in 2012 with several partner NGOs showing the film in connection with various health advice and after-school programs.

Trailer of the Week With reference to current news topics that are related to the work and film selection of Cinema for Peace, the Cinema for Peace Foundation established the "Trailer of the Week". The aim of the Trailer of the Week is to inspire people to dig deeper into issues and topics which the news only cover on the surface. Furthermore, we want to promote and support small film productions from our film selection which deal with these topics in a valuable way but which haven't received broad public recognition. The Trailer of the Week is delivered in newsletter form to the Cinema for Peace network and anyone willing to sign up to the mailing list.

Cinema for Peace Foundation Screenings. On a regular basis the Cinema for Peace Foundation arranges for freely accessible special film screenings accompanied by directors and/or actors involved in the production to illustrate and help raise further awareness for areas of need as well as initiate change.

Cinema for Peace Foundation Awareness Programs

Berlinger Petition. The Cinema for Peace Foundation initiated a petition to support filmmaker Joe Berlinger, winner of the International Green Film Award at Cinema for Peace 2010, in his defence against a lawsuit by the Chevron Oil Company.  In 2010, a U.S. District Court ordered Berlinger to surrender 600 hours of outtakes from his documentary, Crude.  The film depicts a lawsuit by indigenous people against the Chevron Oil Company for environmental destruction allegedly caused by the company's activities in Ecuador. On appeal, the U.S. Second Circuit Court of Appeals ultimately limited the amount of footage that Berlinger was required to provide.

Sakineh Mohammadi Ashtiani Awareness Campaign.  Sakineh Mohammadi Ashtiani, an Iranian mother of two was convicted of adultery in 2006 and later sentenced to death by stoning.  Her execution was postponed, though not commuted. In support of Ashtiani, the Cinema for Peace Foundation organized a press conference, attended by Ashtiani's lawyer and human rights campaigners on 18 August 2010, that included a screening of the film, The Stoning of Soraya M. directed by Cyrus Nowrasteh., winner of the Cinema for Peace Award for Justice 2010. The foundation later mailed DVD copies of The Stoning of Soraya M. to United States Senators, members of the German Parliament and authorities in the Islamic Republic of Iran, demanding the halt of execution by stoning and the immediate release of Ashtiani.

Burma Petition. 
In February 2011, the Cinema for Peace Foundation organized a petition together with Burmese human rights activist and Nobel Peace Prize laureate Aung San Suu Kyi to demand the release of the Burmese comedian Zarganar and the removal of a work ban imposed on actor U Kyaw Thu.  Zarganar was sentenced to 35 years imprisonment for speaking to the foreign media and openly criticizing the Burmese government's failure to aid victims of cyclone Norgis.  U Kyaw Thu has been banned from acting for openly opposing state censorship in Burma.

Conflict Mineral Campaign 
In January 2013, Cinema for Peace Foundation organized a special screening during the World Economic Forum in Davos on the topic of Eastern Congo with the film "Blood in the Mobile". The screening was followed by a panel discussion with Ken Roth, Executive Director of Human Rights Watch as well as Kumi Naidoo, International Executive Director of Greenpeace. In March 2013, Cinema for Peace Foundation started a mail campaign aimed at electronics manufacturers and relevant decision-makers in order to raise awareness and to compel change on the issue of conflict minerals.

Cinema for Peace Foundation Special Initiatives
Special Evening on Justice.  
Together with the Trust Fund for Victims and the International Criminal Court, the Cinema for Peace Foundation organized a Special Evening on Justice on the eve of the Review Conference of the International Criminal Court Statute in Kampala, Uganda. Ban Ki-moon recognized the Cinema for Peace Foundation in his remarks, "Let me applaud Cinema for Peace.  Every time you and your friends from the creative community reach out to help people to learn about human rights and justice, you help the UN to keep the peace."

Special Evening on Africa.  The Cinema for Peace Foundation organized a Special Evening on Africa on 19 September 2010 at the United Nations Millennium Development Goals Summit in New York City.  Supporter Bob Geldof and MDG Co-Chair and Rwandan President Paul Kagame spoke at the event to call for adherence to the Millennium Development Goals of 2000.

Green Evening:Into the Cold - A Journey of the Soul Screening.  
On 12 November 2010 the Foundation hosted a Green Evening with British actor Orlando Bloom in Berlin to promote Sebastian Copeland's movie, Into the Cold - A Journey of the Soul.  The film retraces two men's expedition to the North Pole covering over 400 miles on foot, while documenting the rapidly vanishing polar environment.

Nobel Peace Prize Screening.  On Human Rights Day, 10 December 2010, the Cinema for Peace Foundation, Amnesty International, Movies that Matter and the Human Rights Film Network organized an internationally coordinated screening of Moving the Mountain in honor of Nobel Peace Prize Laureate Liu Xiaobo.  The screenings were scheduled to take place on the day Xiaobo would have personally received his Nobel Peace Prize had he not been in prison in China.  The film was shown in Berlin, The Hague, the Nobel Peace Center in Oslo, and the Human Rights Film Festivals in Vienna, Warsaw and Amman.  Moving the Mountain is a 1994 documentary by Michael Apted that depicts the student-led democracy movement of 1989 in Tiananmen Square.

Dinner for Tibet. The Cinema for Peace Foundation organized a film program and dinner to support Tibetan culture on the occasion of the last visit of the 14th Dalai Lama in Wiesbaden in August 2011.

Dinner and Symposium on the Issue of Child Soldiers. The Foundation also supported a symposium on the issue of "Child Soldiers" conducted by the International Criminal Court (ICC) in The Hague in August 2011 expanding this encounter by film screenings and a charity dinner. The event was to accompany the final declaration of the historically remarkable "Lubanga Case", in which for the first time that Congolese rebel leader was held accountable for violating the ban on the recruitment and use of child soldiers as formulated in article 8, paragraph 2 of the Rome Statute. Former child soldiers attended the encounter as well a UNHCR Goodwill Ambassador Angelina Jolie and the UN Special Representative on Children in Armed Conflict, Radhika Coomaraswamy. All parties involved phrased a petition in which all UN member states are called upon to condemn the use of child soldiers, to fight the use of sexual violence in war and to make efforts to prevent that schools and hospitals become targets of armed attacks.

Celebration of First Ever Logo for Human Rights The first ever logo for human rights was celebrated at an event in New York hosted by the Cinema for Peace Foundation on Friday 23 September 2011. The new design which brings to mind both a human hand and a bird in flight was created by Serbian designer Predrag Stakic. Stakic's logo is the winner of an online contest, and was chosen from more than 15,000 entries which were submitted by designers in 190 countries. Among the guests were Robert De Niro and the German Foreign Minister Guido Westerwelle and various human rights defenders as the mother and the sister of Mohamed Bouazizi, whose self-immolation brought about the Arab Spring. In a video message Aung San Suu Kyi said, "I look forward to a time when this logo will be seen all over the world ... I hope that little children and babies will see it and it will be a sign of happiness, peace and security to them."

Justice Gala On the occasion of the 10th Session of the Assembly of the States Parties of the ICC, the inaugural Justice Gala took place on 12 December 2011 to recognize the growing global role of the ICC in the struggle for international justice and human rights. The Gala was held in New York by the Office of the Prosecutor of the ICC and the Cinema for Peace Foundation. 
At the Gala event, Justitia Awards were given to Luis Moreno-Ocampo - the first Prosecutor of the ICC - Botswana’s President Ian Khama, Angelina Jolie, Benjamin Ferencz- a Chief Prosecutor of Nazi war crimes at Nuremberg - and other individuals and organizations who have played an important role in fulfilling the mission and goals of the International Criminal Court.

Freedom of Expression – An Evening in Honor of Ai Weiwei 100 personalities joined "Art & Cinema for Peace" for Ai Weiwei at Art Basel to give him a voice / Special screening of Documentary Ai Weiwei – Never Sorry, followed by a panel discussion and dinner at Fondation Beyeler in Basel. The Chinese artist Ai Weiwei made a rare video statement for the dinner out of his house arrest on the evening of 10 June 2012, stating that his detention was a punishment for criticizing the authorities for the violation of human rights and freedom.

The Prosecutor – In the Name of Justice On 15 June 2012 Cinema for Peace, with the Office of the Prosecutor, hosted a special justice evening in The Hague, to honor and farewell the first Chief Prosecutor of the International Criminal Court and welcome his successor Fatou Bensouda in her new role. During the evening the short film "S.O.S. – Siege on Syria" was premiered.

Sports for Peace – Muhammad Ali On the occasion of the Olympic Games in London, Cinema for Peace Foundation consulted the Olympic Games committee and brought Muhammad Ali to the opening ceremony, with the overall theme being human rights and sports.

Funding
The Cinema for Peace Foundation is funded through private donations and from parts of the proceeds of the annual Cinema for Peace Gala and its related charity auction. The Cinema for Peace Foundation is politically, financially and morally completely independent.

References

External links
 

Non-profit organisations based in Berlin
Charities based in Germany